The Roman Catholic Diocese of Kisantu is a diocese located in the city of Kisantu  in the Ecclesiastical province of Kinshasa in the Democratic Republic of the Congo.

History
 1 April 1931: Established as Apostolic Vicariate of Kisantu from the Apostolic Vicariate of Koango
 10 November 1959: Promoted as Diocese of Kisantu

Bishops

Ordinaries
 Vicar Apostolic of Kisantu (Latin Rite) 
 Alphonse Verwimp, S.J. (23 June 1931 – 10 November 1959 ); see below
 Bishops of Kisantu (Latin Rite)
Alphonse Verwimp, S.J. (10 November 1959 – 27 October 1960 ); see above
Pierre Kimbondo (24 June 1961 – 27 April 1973 ), Archbishop (personal title) in 1971
Antoine Mayala ma Mpangu (27 April 1973 – 31 March 1993 ) 
Fidèle Nsielele Zi Mputu (10 June 1994 - )

Coadjutor bishop
Antoine Mayala ma Mpangu (1971-1973)

Auxiliary bishop
Pierre Kimbondo (1956-1961), appointed Bishop here

See also
Roman Catholicism in the Democratic Republic of the Congo

Sources
 GCatholic.org
 Catholic Hierarchy

Roman Catholic dioceses in the Democratic Republic of the Congo
Christian organizations established in 1931
Roman Catholic dioceses and prelatures established in the 20th century
1931 establishments in the Belgian Congo
Kisantu
Roman Catholic Ecclesiastical Province of Kinshasa